Zulm Ko Jala Doonga is a 1988 Bollywood action film directed by Mahendra Shah, starring Naseeruddin Shah and Kiran Kumar in lead roles.

Cast
Naseeruddin Shah as Hariya
Kiran Kumar as Dharamdas
Sadashiv Amrapurkar as Police Inspector
Parikshit Sahni as Police Commissioner

Music

External links

References

1988 films
Films scored by Nadeem–Shravan
1980s Hindi-language films
Indian action films